Alfreds Alslēbens (12 July 1892 – 26 November 1930) was a Russian Empire track and field athlete who competed in the 1912 Summer Olympics. He was born in Rīga, Russian Empire. He competed in the decathlon. He finished twelfth and last out of those who finished, whittled down from the twenty-nine athletes who began the event.

See also 
 Russia at the 1912 Summer Olympics

References

Sources
 
 Mention of Alfreds Alslebens' death  

Decathletes from the Russian Empire
Olympic competitors for the Russian Empire
Athletes (track and field) at the 1912 Summer Olympics
1892 births
1930 deaths
Olympic decathletes